John Kourkouas or Curcuas was the Byzantine catepan of Italy from 1008–1010. 

John belonging to the Kourkouas family of Armenian descent. Kourkouas arrived at Bari in May 1008, as a replacement for Alexios Xiphias, who had died sometime between April and August of the previous year. He served as catepan of Italy until some time before March 1010, when his successor, Basil Mesardonites, is attested in office. According to the Italian chronicles of Lupus Protospatharius and Anonymus Barensis, he died in office in 1010.

Nothing is known of his tenure, as the only information about him comes from deeds confirmed by his successors, and brief references in Italian sources. John's government coincided with the first revolt of the Lombards in Greek Apulia, under Melus of Bari. 

A possible descendant or relative, the notary John Kourkouas, is attested in southern Italy some time before 1054.

References

Sources
 
 

11th-century catepans of Italy
1010 deaths
Byzantine generals
John
Year of birth unknown